Alaa Ali (28 January 1988 – 11 November 2019) was an Egyptian footballer who played as an attacking midfielder.

Career
Coming through Zamalek's youth academy and establishing himself as one of their best players, Ali went out on loan to Telephonat Beni Suef in 2013. Ali signed for Smouha in 2013. Later on, he played for short periods for Tala'ea El Gaish, Wadi Degla, Al Masry and Petrojet.

Death
Ali died on 11 November 2019, aged 31, due to cancer.

References

1988 births
2019 deaths
Egyptian footballers
Association football midfielders
Zamalek SC players
Telephonat Beni Suef SC players
Smouha SC players
Tala'ea El Gaish SC players
Place of death missing
Wadi Degla SC players
Al Masry SC players
Petrojet SC players
Deaths from cancer in Egypt